Macedonian Idol Season 1 ( – Makedonski Idol) was the first and only season of the Macedonian version of the worldwide known talent franchise series Pop Idol. The show started airing on 13 November 2010 on A1 TV and finished airing on 30 May 2011 with the big final held in Metropolis Arena, Skopje. The winner was Ivan Radenov from Gevgelija. As first runner-up finished Ivan Radenov and second runner-up Dejan Jovanov.

The auditions started in the summer 2010. Ten Macedonian cities were included: Ohrid, Kavadarci, Strumica, Veles, Štip, Kumanovo, Skopje, Bitola, Tetovo and Prilep. Three famous Macedonian personalities were chosen to be the judges: Kaliopi Bukle (singer), Igor Džambazov (TV host, singer and actor) and Toni Mihajlovski (TV host and actor). Ivanna Hadžievska and Nenad Gjeorgjievski famous for being hosts of the show-magazine A1 Exclusive were the hosts of the show.

Twenty candidates were chosen for the final cut of the show. However, in the final concerts got only 13 candidates (finalists). The other seven were promised to record a song, which will be given as an award from the jury.

Live shows 
The concerts began airing on 7 March 2011 and in the semi-finals the finalists were divided on male and female. In the first and second semi-final, ten candidates got through to the final (5 males, 5 females). The producers organized another show, where the eliminated candidates of the previous two semi-finals competed. Three more contestants were chosen to sing in the final. The big concerts or the finals started with the Top 13 finalists. The shows are airing live every Monday in 20:00 (8:00 pm) CET (UTC+01:00). Every big concert has its theme.

Top 13 – Toše Proeski 
28 March 2011

Top 12 – Macedonian Evergreens 
4 April 2011

Top 11 – Diva's Night 
11 April 2011

Top 10 – The Beatles 
18 April 2011

Top 9 – Ex-Yu Hits 
25 April 2011

Top 7 – Pop Hits 
2 May 2011

Top 6 – Staff's choice: Macedonian pop songs & English duets 
9 May 2011

Top 5 – Rock music 
16 May 2011

Top 4 – Best from the artist 
23 May 2011

Top 3 – Macedonian folk music, Dance hits (Judges' choice), Contestant's choice 
30 May 2011

Elimination table

See also 
 Macedonian Idol
 Idol Serbia-Montenegro & Macedonia
 Pop Idol
 Macedonian music

References

External links 
Official website
Official Facebook site

Idols (franchise)
2010 Macedonian television seasons
2011 Macedonian television seasons